Acebedo (Leonese: Acebéu), is a municipality located in the northeast of the province of León, Castile and León, Spain. According to the 2010 census (INE), the municipality had a population of 264 inhabitants.

Attached to this municipality are the villages of Liegos and La Uña.

References

External links 
 Official website

Municipalities in the Province of León

gl:Destriana